Claire D. Rouillard is an American lawyer and politician who serves as a member of the New Hampshire House of Representatives.

References

External links

Living people
Republican Party members of the New Hampshire House of Representatives
People from Goffstown, New Hampshire
21st-century American politicians
Women state legislators in New Hampshire
Year of birth missing (living people)
21st-century American women politicians